In enzymology, a haloacetate dehalogenase is an enzyme that catalyzes the chemical reaction

haloacetate + H2O  glycolate + halide

Thus, the two substrates of this enzyme are haloacetate and H2O, whereas its two products are glycolate and halide. For examples, in the case of fluoroacetate in will produce glycolate and fluoride.

This enzyme belongs to the family of hydrolases, one of the largest known enzyme families comprising approximately 1% of the genes in the human genome, exists as a homodimer, and acts specifically halide bonds in carbon-halide compounds.  The systematic name of this enzyme class is haloacetate halidohydrolase. This enzyme is also called monohaloacetate dehalogenase and fluoroacetate dehalogenase.  This enzyme participates in gamma-hexachlorocyclohexane degradation and 1,2-dichloroethane degradation.

Reactions
Haloacetate dehalogenase is unique because it catalyzes the cleavage of the remarkably stable carbon–fluorine bond of a fluorinated aliphatic compound. In the reaction of L-2-haloacid dehalogenase and fluoroacetate dehalogenase, the carboxylate group performs a nucleophilic attack on the alpha-carbon atom, moving the halogen atom. This action is common to haloalkane dehalogenase and 4-chlorobenzoyl-CoA dehalogenase. DL-2-Haloacid dehalogenase is unique in that a water molecule directly attacks the substrate, displacing the halogen atom.

Significance
As fluoroacetate is poisonous and present in plants endemic to Australia, Africa, and Central America, livestock are often killed by fluoroacetate poisoning. Fluoroacetate is lethal to sheep and cattle at doses of 0.25 to 0.5 mg/kg of  body weight, and is a problem in the livestock industry. A fluoroacetate dehalogenase gene from the soil bacterium Moraxella species strain B was transferred into the rumen bacterium Butyrivibrio fibrisolvens and expressed in vitro at sufficiently high levels to detoxify fluoroacetate in the surrounding medium. Scientists and farmers want to determine a way to get B. fibrisolvens into either the animals or plants.

Structural studies

As of late 2007, only one structure has been solved for this class of enzymes, with the PDB accession code .

References

 
 
 The Japan Chemical Journal Forum and Wiley Periodicals, Inc.2008
 MacKenzie, D. Trouble in the wind over altered soya beans. New Scientist. Vol 148 (2006),pp12. December 2, 1995
 1995 Soy Stats. American Soybean Association Homepage.
 Plant biotech will hit farming sector radar screen in 1996. BioBusiness. December 8, 1995
 Tatsuo Kurihara  Journal of  Biochemistry. Vol. 131, pp. 671–677 (2002), Regular paper;2002

EC 3.8.1
Enzymes of known structure